The Goodrich Corporation, formerly the B.F. Goodrich Company, was an American manufacturing company based in Charlotte, North Carolina. Founded in Akron, Ohio in 1870 as Goodrich, Tew & Co. by Benjamin Goodrich, the company name was changed to the "B.F. Goodrich Company" in 1880, to BFGoodrich in the 1980s, and to "Goodrich Corporation" in 2001. Originally a rubber manufacturing company known for automobile tires, the company diversified its manufacturing businesses throughout the twentieth century and sold off its tire business in 1986 to focus on its other businesses, such as aerospace and chemical manufacturing. The BFGoodrich brand name continues to be used by Michelin, who acquired the tire manufacturing business in 1988. Following the acquisition by United Technologies in 2012, Goodrich became a part of UTC Aerospace Systems.

In 1869, Benjamin Goodrich purchased the Hudson River Rubber Company, a small business in Hastings-on-Hudson, New York. The following year Goodrich accepted an offer of $13,600 from the citizens of Akron, Ohio, to relocate his business there.

The company grew to be one of the largest tire and rubber manufacturers in the world, helped in part by the 1986 merger with Uniroyal (formerly the United States Rubber Company). This product line was sold to Michelin in 1988, and the company merged with Rohr (1997), Coltec Industries, and TRW Aeronautical Systems (formerly Lucas Aerospace) in 2002. The sale of the specialty chemicals division and subsequent change to the current name completed the transformation. In 2006, company sales were $5.8 billion, of which 18%, 16% and 12% of total revenues were accounted for by the U.S. government, Airbus and Boeing, respectively.

In 1988, the Goodrich Corporation sold its tire business and rights to the Goodrich name  to French company Michelin. During the 1970s, Goodrich ran television and print ads to distinguish themselves from the similar-sounding Goodyear tire company. The tag line was, "We're the other guys. Remember?" The company was also sometimes confused with Mr. Goodwrench as the two last names were similar, especially since B.F. Goodrich tires were featured on many General Motors cars and trucks.

History

Early history

In 1869 Benjamin Goodrich purchased the Hudson River Rubber Company, a small business in Hastings-on-Hudson, New York. The following year Goodrich accepted an offer of $13,600 from the citizens of Akron, Ohio, to relocate his business there.

In 1909, the company constructed a 12-story building with a facade influenced by Jacobean Revival style and Vienna Secession for its New York Headquarters, located at 1780 Broadway, New York. which is now become one of the historical landmarks.

In March 1912, the Diamond Rubber Company, founded by the owner of the Diamond Match Company, was bought out by and merged with the B.F. Goodrich Company. The Diamond brand name and product line were retained and a subsidiary Diamond Rubber Company created for the marketing and manufacturing of them.

The company helped found and start the Yokohama Rubber Company on Oct 13, 1917, in a joint venture between Yokohama Cable Manufacturing and B.F. Goodrich.

B.F. Goodrich sold radios from the 1930s to the 1950s, under the brand name "Mantola". These radios were actually made by a variety of manufacturers for B.F. Goodrich.

In 1936 the company entered the Mexican market in a joint venture, Goodrich-Euzkadi (now part of Continental AG).

Goodrich ranked 67th among United States corporations in the value of World War II military production contracts.

The Troy, Ohio plant was purchased in 1946 from Waco. Since then, Goodrich has manufactured wheels and brakes for a variety of aircraft. Among these are commercial, military, regional, and business programs. This successful operation lies at the core of Goodrich's business. Competitors include the aerostructures divisions of companies such as Honeywell, Messier-Bugatti, Aircraft Braking Systems, (Howmet/Huck) and SNECMA. The Hood Rubber Company was sold before the Great Depression as a division of the B.F. Goodrich Company.

1980–1990s
By 1986 B.F. Goodrich had become an S&P 500-listed company in diverse business, including tire and rubber fabrication. B.F. Goodrich made high-performance replacement tires. In August 1986, one of its biggest competitors in the tire business, Uniroyal Inc., was taken private when it merged with the tire segment of the B.F. Goodrich Company, in a joint venture private partnership, to become the Uniroyal Goodrich Tire Company. B.F. Goodrich Company held a 50% stake in the new tire company.

The new Uniroyal Goodrich Tire Company headquarters was established at the former B.F. Goodrich corporate headquarters, within its 27-building downtown complex in Akron, Ohio which contained Goodrich's original factory. In the autumn of 1987 B.F. Goodrich Company shut down several manufacturing operations at the site, and most of the complex remained vacant until February 1988, when B.F. Goodrich announced plans to sell the vacant part of the complex to the Covington Capital Corporation, a group of New York developers.

In 1987, its first full year of operation, the new Uniroyal Goodrich Tire Company generated almost $2 billion in sales revenue, with profits of $35 million.

The merger soon proved to be difficult. In June 1988 B.F. Goodrich sold its 50% stake for $225 million. The buyers were a group of investors led by Clayton, Dubilier & Rice a private New York investment firm. At the same time, B.F. Goodrich also received a warrant to purchase indirectly up to 7% of the equity in Uniroyal Goodrich Tire Company.

As part of the June 1988 sale deal, the new privately held tire company acquired publicly held debt of $415 million.

Also in 1988, Michelin Group, a subsidiary of the French tire company Michelin et Cie proposed to acquire the Uniroyal Goodrich Tire Company and took actions towards acquiring a stake.  By May 1990, Michelin Group had completed its buyout of Uniroyal Goodrich Tire Company from Clayton & Dubilier of New York. The deal was valued at about US$1.5 billion. B.F. Goodrich surrendered its 7% warrant to Michelin Group, and received $32.5 million additional revenue from the sale.

Leaving tire business
B.F. Goodrich by then exited the tire business entirely, in line with its plan to build its chemicals and aerospace businesses through reinvestment and acquisitions. In 1997 it acquired Rohr, a maker of jet aircraft engine nacelles (the aerodynamic structures that surround aircraft engines), expanding its presence in integrated aircraft components industry.

In 1999 it acquired Charlotte, North Carolina-based Coltec Industries for $2.2 billion in stock and assumed debt, making the former tire maker the No. 1 supplier of landing gear and other aircraft parts. Headquarters were moved to Charlotte following this merger.

In 2001, the company divested its specialty chemicals business to focus on aerospace and industrial products and, to signify the completion of its transformation, it was renamed Goodrich Corporation and adopted a new logo.

In October 2002, Goodrich acquired TRW Aeronautical Systems, this division was mainly the former Lucas Aerospace activity, mostly based in the UK and France.

In November 2010, Goodrich opened a large new manufacturing centre in Krosno Rzeszow, Poland.

Fate
In September 2011, United Technologies Corporation announced a deal to buy Goodrich for $18.4 billion, paying $127.50 per share and assuming $1.9 billion in debt.

On July 26, 2012, United Technologies Corporation purchased Goodrich. Unsold divisions of Hamilton Sundstrand and Goodrich were then merged to create UTC Aerospace Systems. Rocketdyne, Hamilton Sundstrand's industrial pumps and compressors operations, Clipper Windpower, and UTC Power (United Technologies' fuel-cell business) would be sold off to raise cash for the deal.

On October 16, 2012, United Technologies Corporation secured an agreement to sell the Power Systems division of Goodrich (Twinsburg Ohio, Pitstone Green Buckinghamshire) to Safran for $400 million. The sale of this business unit was a condition that the Chinese competition regulators set in approving UTC's purchase of Goodrich. The Power Systems division had to be divested by December 16, 2012. Ultimately, the sale was completed on 27 March 2013.
  
In April 2020, the remaining portions of Goodrich became part of the Collins Aerospace subsidiary of Raytheon Technologies, a firm which resulted from the merger of United Technologies and the Raytheon Company.

Technologies

Actuation and landing systems
Actuation systems
Aircraft wheels and brakes
Aviation technical services
Landing gear
Engine components

Electronic systems
Sensors and Integrated systems
Engine control and electrical power systems
ISR (intelligence, surveillance, and reconnaissance) systems
and

Nacelles and interior systems
Aerostructures
Interiors
Customer services

Platforms

Civil
AgustaWestland AW139 helicopter (electronic ice protection system)
Airbus A320 series
Airbus A330/A340
Airbus A350XWB
Airbus A380
Boeing 737
Boeing 747-400
Boeing 757-200
Boeing 767
Boeing 777
Boeing 787
Bombardier Global Express
Canadair Regional Jet
Cessna Citation
Bombardier Dash-8 Q400
Embraer 170
Embraer 190
Handley Page Jetstream
Lear Jet
Piaggio P180

Military
A-6 Intruder
Airbus A400M (Electrical power generation, flaps, transmission ice detection sensors)
B-52 Stratofortress
CH-46 Sea Knight (wheels or rotor brakes)
C-141 Starlifter
C-5 Galaxy
CH-47 Chinook (wheels or rotor brakes)
CH-53 Sea Stallion (wheels or rotor brakes)
Embraer KC-390
F-14 Tomcat
F-15 Eagle  (radome erosion boot)
F-16 Fighting Falcon (nosewheel)
F-117 Nighthawk
F-111 Aardvark
Harrier jump jet – all versions (hydromechanical fuel systems)
P-3 Orion
Panavia Tornado – all versions (engine controls, high lift control unit, flap and slat actuation, nozzle control)
S-3 Viking
SEPECAT Jaguar – all versions (hydromechanical fuel systems)
Space Shuttles (wheels and brakes; tire business sold to Michelin in 1988)
V-22 Osprey (wheels or rotor brakes)

Restatements
On Feb 24, 2004, Goodrich restated its fourth-quarter and full-year earnings results for 2003 after Pratt & Whitney notified the company that it was drastically cutting its order for engine casing components.

Notable employees
Benjamin S. Garvey – worked for B.F. Goodrich and Pennsalt Chemicals Corporation. Dr. Garvey developed the "10 Gram Evaluation Process."
William C. Geer – pioneer in studying rubber ageing, and developer of early aircraft de-icing systems, vice-president at B. F. Goodrich
David Grylls, Chula Vista, California, Olympic Silver Medal Winning Cyclist
Frank Herzegh, inventor of the tubeless tire
Samuel E. Horne Jr. – Goodrich chemist who first polymerized synthetic polyisoprene using Ziegler catalyst
Arthur E. Juve – B. F. Goodrich Director of Technology who developed oil-resistant rubber compositions, lab tests for tire treads, and improvements in manufacture of rubber products and the processing of synthetic rubber
Virgil A. Martin, Los Angeles, California, City Council member (1927–31)

George Oenslager – chemist known for pioneering vulcanization accelerator chemistry
John D. Ong, CEO (1979-1996) and U.S. Ambassador to Norway (2002-2005)
Waldo L. Semon – early developer of synthetic rubber, in particular Ameripol for B. F. Goodrich.

References

http://www.nndb.com/people/368/000164873/

Further reading
 Blackford, Mansel G. and K. Austin Kerr.  B. F. Goodrich: Tradition and Transformation, 1870–1995; (Ohio State University Press, 1996); .
 Blackford, Mansel G. "B. F. Goodrich Becomes a Multinational Corporation, 1910-1929," Essays in Economic & Business History (1996), Vol. 14, pp 365–373.

External links

Turbine Fuel Technologies (A Goodrich Company)
Delavan Spray Technologies (A Goodrich Company) 

 

1870 establishments in Ohio
2012 mergers and acquisitions
Aircraft component manufacturers of the United States
Companies based in Charlotte, North Carolina
Companies formerly listed on the New York Stock Exchange
Defense companies of the United States
Former components of the Dow Jones Industrial Average
Manufacturing companies based in North Carolina
Manufacturing companies disestablished in 2012
Manufacturing companies established in 1870
Superfund sites in California
Superfund sites in Kentucky
U.S. Synthetic Rubber Program